This article contains a list of encyclicals of Pope Benedict XV.  Pope Benedict XV issued 12 papal encyclicals during his reign as Pope.

The encyclicals of Benedict XV

External links
 The list of encyclicals on the Vatican official website.

Encyclicals
Benedict 15